The Cerro Pico Alto is the third highest mountain of the Cerros de Escazú, Costa Rica with . Pico Alto means high peak.

See also
Cerro Cedral
Cerro Pico Blanco
Cerro Rabo de Mico
Cerro San Miguel

References

Mountains of the Cerros de Escazú
Mountains of Costa Rica